Jean-François-Théodore Gechter (1795, Paris - 1844, Paris) was a French sculptor. A student of François Joseph Bosio and baron Gros, he is now most noted for his bronzes. He first exhibited in 1824, in a show of classical and mythological subjects. From 1830 he shifted to smaller sculptures and animal subjects, like Antoine-Louis Barye, another student of Bosio and Gros. He also had a talent for historical scenes with figures in elaborate costumes.

Gechter's penchant and gift in depicting historical scenes reached new heights when in 1833 he exhibited his Combat of Charles Martel and Abderame, King of the Saracens. The bronze work was commissioned by the ministry of commerce and industry. Gechter's motif of dressing his subjects in elaborate dresses and depicting scenes of battles or hunts from the Renaissance could be considered as belonging to the genre known as troubadour. But the uniqueness of Gechter was that he managed to infuse emotions into the genre. Examples of this are Death of Tancred (1827) and Wounded Amazon (1840). This exceptional ability resulted in numerous public commissions. He created a marble relief of the Battle of Austerlitz (1833–6) for the Arc de Triomphe and a marble statue of Louis Philippe, which was commissioned in 1839.

Major works 
 Battle between Charles Martel and Abd er Rahman, King of the Saracens, 1849 : completed by Nicolas-Germain Charpentier
 The death of Tancred, 1837
 Battle between Charles Martel and Abd er Rahman, King of the Saracens, 1833 : with Jean-Honoré Gonon - commissioned by the French Ministry of Commerce.
 Fontaine Rhin-Rhône, Place de la Concorde (Paris), 1835-1840
 Statue of Joan of Arc, Château de Chinon
 Bas relief of the Battle of Austerlitz, on the Arc de Triomphe, place de l'Étoile (Paris), 1833 - 1836
 Francis I of France hunting, Musée de Girodet (Montargis), 1843
 Wounded Amazon, bronze, 1840
 Statue of saint Joan, marble, église de la Madeleine, Paris, 1840
 Statue of Louis-Philippe I, marble, château de Versailles, 1839
 Bust of Jacques d'Albon, seigneur de Saint-André; Galerie des batailles at the château de Versailles
 L'Engagement, 1839

References

External links 

 

1795 births
1844 deaths
19th-century French sculptors
French male sculptors
19th-century French male artists